Simandhar Swami is a Tīrthaṅkara, an arihant, who is said to be currently living in another world in the Jain cosmological universe.

Residence in Jain cosmology

Tirthankara Simandhar Swami resides at Mahavideh Kshetra, another land within the Jain cosmological universe (see Jain cosmology).

The five lands of the Bharat Kshetra are currently in the fifth Ara (a degraded time-cycle in which Tirthankaras do not take birth). The most recent Tirthankara present on Bharat Kshetra (present world) was Vardhamana Mahavira, whom historians estimate lived between 599 and 527 BCE, the last in a cycle of 24 Tirthankaras.

On Mahavideh Kshetra, the fourth Ara (a spiritually elevated time-cycle) exists continuously. There, Tirthankaras perpetually are born. There are 5 Mahavideh Kshetras, each being a separate land.  At present, there are 4 Tirthankars residing in each Mahavideh Kshetra.  Thus there are a total of 20 Tirthankaras residing there, Simandhar Swami being one among them.

Biography per Jain tradition

Simandhar Swami is a living Tirthankar, an Arihant, who is said to be currently present on another world in the Jain cosmological universe.
The Arihant Simandhar Swami is believed to be currently 150,000 earth years old (equivalent to 49 years at Mahavideh Kshetra), and has a remaining lifespan of 125,000 earth years.
He lives in the city of Pundarikgiri, the capital of Pushpakalavati, one of 32 geographical divisions on Mahavideh Kshetra. Pundarikgiri is ruled by King Shreyans, who is Simandhar Swami's father. His mother is Queen Satyaki. While pregnant with Simandhar Swami, Queen Satyaki had a sequence of auspicious dreams indicating that she would give birth to a Tirthankara. Simandhar Swami was born with three complete aspects of Gnan, Self-knowledge:

 Mati Gnan (see Jain epistemology), knowledge of the 5-sense realm
 Shruta Gnan (see Jain epistemology), knowledge of all forms of communication
 Avadhi Gnan (see Jain epistemology), clairvoyant knowledge

As a young adult, he married Rukamani Devi and then, later in life, took diksha, renunciation from worldly life.

Simandhar Swami's height is 500 dhanushya, approximately 1,500 feet, which is considered an average height for the people of Mahavideh Kshetra.

Worship

Iconography 
Simandhara is usually depicted in a sitting or standing meditative posture with the symbol of a bull beneath him. Every Tīrthankara has a distinguishing emblem that allows worshippers to distinguish similar-looking idols of the Tirthankaras.

Main temples 
 Trimandir, Adalaj

See also 

 Akram Vignan Movement

Notes

References

 

 

 
 

 
 
 
 

Tirthankaras